The Paraguay Billie Jean King Cup team represents Paraguay in the Billie Jean King Cup tennis competition and are governed by the Asociación Paraguaya de Tenis.  

Paraguay competed in Americas Zone Group I in 2016 - its ninth consecutive year at this level.

History

Paraguay's best Fed Cup performances were in 1995 and 2015, when reaching the World Group II play-offs. Its first appearance in the competition was four years earlier in 1991.

Last tie

Paraguay was defeated by Argentina 0-2 in the Americas Zone Group I play-offs in 2016.

Next tie

Paraguay will compete in the Americas Zone Group I in 2017.

Current team (2017)
 Verónica Cepede Royg
 Montserrat González
 Camila Giangreco Campiz
 Lara Escauriza

See also
Fed Cup
Paraguay Davis Cup team

External links

Billie Jean King Cup teams
Fed Cup
Fed Cup
1991 establishments in Paraguay
Sports clubs established in 1991